Nematomenia is a genus of pholidoskepian solenogasters, shell-less, worm-like, marine mollusks.

References

Pholidoskepia